Leslie Dale Walrond (born November 7, 1976) is an American former professional baseball player and current scout for the Los Angeles Dodgers of Major League Baseball.

He is a former left-handed pitcher whose active career extended from 1998–2012. The native of Muskogee, Oklahoma, appeared in 23 Major League games pitched, 21 in relief, for the Kansas City Royals (2003), Chicago Cubs (2006) and Philadelphia Phillies (2008). He appeared in 21 games as a starting pitcher in Nippon Professional Baseball in 2009.

During his freshman and sophomore years in high school, Walrond played baseball at Booker T. Washington High School (Tulsa, Oklahoma) under the tutelage of Coach Corey Slagle. With Walrond anchoring the baseball team, Booker T. experienced an athletic renaissance that included New York Giants defensive back R. W. McQuarters and Washington Wizards center Etan Thomas. He graduated from Union High School in Tulsa and attended the University of Kansas.

Career
Walrond made his Major League debut on June 8, while he was with the Kansas City Royals against the Colorado Rockies as a relief pitcher.

On May 2, Walrond signed as a free agent with the Philadelphia Phillies. He was called up from the Phillies' Triple-A affiliate, the Lehigh Valley IronPigs, on August 1, then sent back down on August 20, following the activation of Pedro Feliz from the disabled list. He was claimed off waivers by the Toronto Blue Jays on November 4, 2008, but waived on November 20. In December, he signed with the Yokohama BayStars of Japan's Central League.

In 2011, Walrond paid for his own airline ticket to the Mets spring training camp where he was signed to a minor league contract. Les pitched well during the Big League Camp, but became ill before the break of camp.  Unfortunately, Les was waived by the Mets.  On April 15, 2011, Les signed a deal with the Lancaster Barnstormers of the Atlantic League.

On May 26, 2011, Walrond signed a minor league deal and was assigned to Double-A Reading two days later. On July 16, 2012 the Toronto Blue Jays announced they signed Walrond to a minor league contract.

Walrond's final season, 2012, was split between independent league baseball and Double-A, where he hurled for the New Hampshire Fisher Cats.

Walrond spent 2014–15 as a professional scout for the Boston Red Sox and joined the Dodgers for the  season.

References

External links

Career statistics and player information from Korea Baseball Organization

1976 births
Living people
African-American baseball players
Albuquerque Isotopes players
American expatriate baseball players in Japan
American expatriate baseball players in South Korea
Baseball players from Oklahoma
Boston Red Sox scouts
Chicago Cubs players
Doosan Bears players
Iowa Cubs players
Kansas City Royals players
Kansas Jayhawks baseball players
KBO League pitchers
Lancaster Barnstormers players
Lehigh Valley IronPigs players
LG Twins players
Los Angeles Dodgers scouts
Major League Baseball pitchers
Memphis Redbirds players
Naranjeros de Hermosillo players
American expatriate baseball players in Mexico
Navegantes del Magallanes players
American expatriate baseball players in Venezuela
New Hampshire Fisher Cats players
New Haven Ravens players
New Jersey Cardinals players
Omaha Royals players
Sportspeople from Muskogee, Oklahoma
Sportspeople from Tulsa, Oklahoma
Peoria Chiefs players
Philadelphia Phillies players
Tennessee Smokies players
Tiburones de La Guaira players
Wichita Wranglers players
Yokohama BayStars players
21st-century African-American sportspeople
20th-century African-American sportspeople